Mount Talinis is a complex volcano in the Philippine province of Negros Oriental.

Geology
Cuernos de Negros is classified by the Philippine Institute of Volcanology and Seismology as a potentially active volcano forming part of the Negros Volcanic Belt. Andesite and basalt are the most abundant rocks found on the mountain. The mountain range is very fumarolic with several solfataras and steam vents located on its slope that are harnessed to generate electricity. The Southern Negros Geothermal Production Field in Palinpinon generates 192.5 MW.

Tourism
Cuernos de Negros volcanic complex is popular with visitors for the natural environment of the forest and many volcanic lakes surrounded by mountains.

Balinsasayao Twin Lakes Natural Park

Within the volcano complex is Balinsasayao Twin Lakes Natural Park, a national park established on November 21, 2000 by Proclamation No. 414. It is a most visited park of which the twin crater lakes of Balinsasayao and Danao are located, separated only by a narrow mountain ridge. Lake Kabalin-an, a smaller lake, is located before the two lakes. All three lakes are located within the Guintabon Caldera.

Hiking Mount Talinis
Mt. Talinis is easily climbed via nature trails that start in Bidjao, Dauin and Apolong, Valencia. Several crater lakes exits: Lake Yagumyum is between Yagumyum Peak and the main peak of Cuernos de Negros; Lake Nailig and Lake Mabilog are crater lakes near the summit. Lake Nailig serves as the main camping ground, with the peak accessible by a 30-minute trek. The summit is heavily forested and mostly covered with fog.
The Kaipohan sulfur vents, an area of dead trees and bleached rocks, can be found on the trail to Apolong, Valencia.

Biodiversity

The region of Mt. Talinis has a rich biodiversity that is threatened by illegal logging, "kaingin", increased tourist activity and the gradual build-up of houses near its forested areas. The lakes around Mt. Talinis contain freshwater shrimp, snails, carp and tilapia species, and its forest system is home to endemic and rare wildlife. There are 91 tree species, 18 of which are commercially important, including Alphonsea arborea, Elaeocarpus monocera, Pometia pinnata, and Phyllocladus hypophyllus and tigerwood. Other notable flora include wild orchids, edible berries and, broad-leafed tree ferns.

Common fauna include boars, civets, chickens, pigeons, monkeys, sunbirds, monitor lizards, bar-bellied cuckoo-shrikes, leopard cats, and the brown weaver ant. Some of the endangered and rare animals are tarictic hornbills, Philippine spotted deers, Visayan warty pigs, Philippine tube-nosed fruit bats, and Negros bleeding-hearts.

See also
 List of active volcanoes in the Philippines
 List of potentially active volcanoes in the Philippines
 List of inactive volcanoes in the Philippines
 Philippine Institute of Volcanology and Seismology
 Lakes in the Philippines

References

External links
 Philippine Institute of Volcanology and Seismology (PHIVOLCS) Cuernos de Negros Page
 
 Hiking Mt. Talinis from Pinoy Mountaineer: Guide to Hiking in the Philippines

Mountains of the Philippines
Volcanoes of Negros Island
Potentially active volcanoes of the Philippines
Landforms of Negros Oriental
Stratovolcanoes of the Philippines